Live at Tralfamadore is the fifth album, and the first live album by the Norwegian band Madrugada.  It was released on EMI records in 2005 and went on to become the highest selling release in Norway for that year with the band's previous release The Deep End as the runner up. The songs were recorded at various locations during 2003 and 2005 as noted in the track listing.  The powerful, ' You Better Leave ' is the only 'new' song on the album and the only song (so far) unavailable elsewhere as a recorded studio version.

The name Tralfamadore is a reference to the fictional home planet of aliens from several novels by the American science fiction author Kurt Vonnegut.

Track listing (Disc 1)
 "Hard to Come Back" – 04:30 - Live at Oslo Spektrum, Oslo December 2, 2005
 "Majesty" - 06:43 - Live at Øyafestivalen, Oslo August 13, 2005
 "You Better Leave" - 04:35 - Live at Oslo Spektrum, Oslo December 2, 2005
 "Strange Colour Blue" - 07:19 - Live at Ancienne Belgique, Brussels March 23, 2003
 "On Your Side" - 04:07 - Live at Oslo Spektrum, Oslo December 2, 2005
 "The Kids Are on High Street" - 04:46 - Live at Bodø Spektrum, Bodø August 10, 2005
 "Seven Seconds" - 03:23 - Live at Ancienne Belgique, Brussels March 23, 2003
 "Mother of Earth" - 04:56 - Live at Oslo Spektrum, Oslo December 2, 2005
 "Running Out of Time" - 05:52 - Live at Oslo Spektrum, Oslo December 2, 2005
 "Black Mambo" - 07:20 - Live at Bodø Spektrum, Bodø August 10, 2005
 "Sometimes I Feel Like a Motherless Child" - 02:28 - Live at Bodø Spektrum, Bodø August 10, 2005
 "Sail Away" - 10:58 - Live at Øyafestivalen, Oslo August 13, 2005

Track listing (Disc 2)
 "Blood Shot Adult Commitment" - 06:24 - Live at Oslo Spektrum, Oslo December 2, 2005
 "Black Mambo (Terror Mix)" - 07:16 - Live at Bodø Spektrum, Bodø August 10, 2005
 "Only When You're Gone" - 07:57 - Live at Bodø Spektrum, Bodø August 10, 2005
 "Lift Me" (single version) - 04:05

References

 

2005 live albums
Madrugada (band) albums